Choe Thae-bok (born 1 December 1930) is a North Korean politician. He is a member of the Politburo and the Secretariat of the Workers' Party of Korea, and was Chairman (speaker) of the Supreme People's Assembly for nearly 21 years, from 1998 to 2019. He was considered an advisor to Kim Jong-il, as well as a popular member of the core leadership. He speaks fluent English, German, Russian in addition to Korean.

Biography
Choe Thae-bok was born in Namp'o, South Pyongan, in 1930. He was one of the first to study at the Mangyongdae Revolutionary School; later he studied chemistry at the Kim Il-sung University, and later completed his studies in Leipzig (then in East Germany) and Moscow. After his return to the DPRK he worked as schoolteacher. Later, in the 1960s, he worked at the Hamhung Chemical Engineering College as researcher, director of research of the Hamhung Branch of the Chemical Research Institute under the National Academy of Sciences (1965), and finally dean of the college (1968). In 1972, he started to work as section chief at the WPK Education Department, being its vice-director from 1976.Starting from late 1970s, when he was appointed faculty dean and later president of the Kim Chaek University of Technology, Choe Thae-bok took a more prominent role in the country's politics. In the 1980s he served as Chairman of the Education Commission (from 1980) and Minister of Higher Education (from 1981); in those capacities, he expanded cultural exchanges with other countries and programs to let North Korean students study abroad. Choe Thae-bok was first elected as a deputy to the Supreme People's Assembly in 1982; in the same year, he led a SPA delegation to France. This was only the first time he led North Korean delegations on official visits, including a journey to the Soviet Union, East Germany, China and Bulgaria in 1984–1985.In 1984, he was appointed alternate member of the 6th Central Committee, then full member and member of the 6th Secretariat in 1986 and 6th Politburo member in 1990. As secretary, Choe Thae-bok was put in charge of education, science and cultural exchanges. Choe Thae-bok was elected chairman of the 10th, 11th and 12th SPAs, a role that increased his involvement in foreign affairs. He also served as chairman of the Korean Committee for Solidarity with the World People from 1993 to 1998. Despite his purported reformist views, he is reputedly close to Kim Jong-il's sister Kim Kyong-hui and Vice President Yang Hyong-sop of the SPA Presidium. On 6 January 2007, at a mass rally in Pyongyang, he gave a speech praising the North Korean government for building nuclear weapons. On 19 October 2012, he met Zandaakhuu Enkhbold, the Mongolian parliamentary speaker, and the two countries "agreed on the future possibilities of bilateral trade and cooperation in the fields of information technology and human exchanges." Choson Sinbo, a pro-Pyongyang newspaper in Japan, said Mongolia is interested in exporting coal, copper, gold, and uranium through Rajin Port because it is too "costly to rely on Chinese and Russian railway systems." In October 2017 he retired as a vice chairman of the WPK. He was then replaced as speaker of the SPA at the new legislature's first session in April 2019.

References

1930 births
Living people
People from Nampo
People from South Pyongan
Government ministers of North Korea
Members of the Supreme People's Assembly
North Korean expatriates in Germany
North Korean expatriates in the Soviet Union
Kim Chaek University of Technology
Members of the 6th Politburo of the Workers' Party of Korea
Alternate members of the 6th Politburo of the Workers' Party of Korea
Members of the 6th Central Committee of the Workers' Party of Korea
Alternate members of the 6th Central Committee of the Workers' Party of Korea
Vice Chairmen of the Workers' Party of Korea and its predecessors